Old Saybrook Center is the primary village and a census-designated place (CDP) in the town of Old Saybrook, Middlesex County, Connecticut, United States. The population was 2,278 at the 2020 census, out of 10,481 in the entire town of Old Saybrook. The CDP includes the traditional town center and the peninsula known as Saybrook Point.

Geography
Old Saybrook Center is in the southeast part of Middlesex County, in the central and eastern part of the town of Old Saybrook. It is bordered to the east by the tidal Connecticut River and its coves, North Cove near the center of the community and South Cove along the southern edge of the community. Saybrook Point, part of the CDP, occupies the land between the two coves.

U.S. Route 1 passes through the northwest part of the community, leading west  to Clinton and northeast  to Old Lyme Center. Connecticut Route 154 passes through the center of Old Saybrook and leads north  to Essex Village and southeast  to Fenwick.

Demographics
As of the census of 2000, there were 1,962 people, 908 households, and 548 families residing in the CDP. The racial makeup of the CDP was 96.08% White, 0.61% African American, 0.05% Native American, 2.14% Asian, 0.20% Pacific Islander, 0.66% from other races, and 0.25% from two or more races. Hispanic or Latino of any race were 1.68% of the population.

There were 908 households, out of which 19.9% had children under the age of 18 living with them, 50.6% were married couples living together, 6.8% had a female householder with no husband present, and 39.6% were non-families. 34.6% of all households were made up of individuals, and 19.6% had someone living alone who was 65 years of age or older.  The average household size was 2.14 and the average family size was 2.74.

In the CDP, the population was spread out, with 17.3% under the age of 18, 4.3% from 18 to 24, 22.8% from 25 to 44, 28.2% from 45 to 64, and 27.3% who were 65 years of age or older.  The median age was 48 years. For every 100 females, there were 88.5 males.  For every 100 females age 18 and over, there were 84.9 males.

The median income for a household in the CDP was $50,625, and the median income for a family was $63,021. Males had a median income of $46,522 versus $41,250 for females. The per capita income for the CDP was $33,217.  None of the families and 4.6% of the population were living below the poverty line, including no under eighteens and 7.5% of those over 64.

References

Old Saybrook, Connecticut
Census-designated places in Middlesex County, Connecticut
Neighborhoods in Connecticut
Census-designated places in Connecticut
Populated coastal places in Connecticut